"I Wanna Be Your Boyfriend" is a song by the American punk rock band the Ramones. Written by drummer Tommy Ramone, it was released on the first Ramones album.  It was also released as the Ramones' second single, following "Blitzkrieg Bop."

Background
"I Wanna Be Your Boyfriend" is the fourth track on the Ramones' debut album, Ramones. It was released as a single in September 1976. The song was written around 1975, as two demos of the tune were made prior to the debut and single releases.

References

1976 songs
2002 singles
Ramones songs
Songs written by Tommy Ramone
Song recordings produced by Craig Leon
1976 singles
American pop punk songs